Biloxi, Mississippi is a city in southeastern Mississippi, United States.

Biloxi may also refer to:

People
 Biloxi people, a historical indigenous people who lived along the Mississippi River
 Tunica-Biloxi the federally recognized tribe which includes the descendants of the original Biloxi tribe

Places

Mississippi
Biloxi (Amtrak station), an unstaffed railroad station
Biloxi River
Biloxi Public School District
Biloxi High School
Gulfport–Biloxi International Airport
Gulfport–Biloxi metropolitan area, the three-county MSA in southeastern Mississippi 
Gulfport–Biloxi–Pascagoula Combined Statistical Area, the five-county CSA in southeastern Mississippi

Other places
Biloxi, Texas, a village in southeastern Texas

Other uses
Biloxi (album), an album by Jimmy Buffett
Biloxi language, an extinct Siouan-Catawban language once spoken by the Biloxi tribe
"Biloxi", a song written by Jesse Winchester
Fort Biloxi, a fictitious locale in the 1980 film Private Benjamin
USS Biloxi (CL-80), a US Navy light cruiser
Biloxi Shuckers